The 2018 World TeamTennis season was the 43rd season of the top professional team tennis league in the United States.

The Springfield Lasers defeated the Philadelphia Freedoms in the WTT Finals to win their first King Trophy as WTT champions.

Competition format
The 2018 World TeamTennis season included six teams. Each team played a 14-match regular-season schedule with seven home and seven away matches. The top two teams in the regular season qualified for the World TeamTennis Finals. The higher seed was treated as the "home" team in the WTT Finals and had the right to determine the order of play. The winner of the WTT Finals was awarded the King Trophy.

Teams and players
Roster players compete (nearly) the entire season, Franchise and Wildcard players only a limited season. Substitute players are not listed.

 On 2 August 2018, the Springfield Lasers traded Marcelo Demoliner from the Orange County Breakers for Daniel Nestor.

Standings
The top two teams qualified for the 2018 WTT Finals.

Results table

Statistical leaders
The table below shows the WTT team and the player who had the highest regular-season winning percentages in each of the league's five events. Only players who played in at least 40% of the total number of games played by their team in a particular event are eligible to be listed.

 Most Valuable Players  Female MVP: Taylor Townsend  Male MVP: Marcin Matkowski

WTT Finals

Match summary

See also

 Team tennis

References

External links
 Official website

World TeamTennis season
World TeamTennis seasons